Matte Mungaru is a 2010 Indian Kannada movie directed by Dwarki and starring Srinagar Kitty and  Rachana Malhothra. The film released to positive reviews but went unnoticed at the box office.

Story
Matte Mungaru tells the true-life story of Narayana Mandhagadde, a man from Shivamogga district in Karnataka who served 21 years in prison in Pakistan. He returned home in 2003 with the intervention of the former prime minister Atal Behari Vajpayee.

Cast 
Srinagara Kitty as Naani
Rachana Malhothra as Thara
 Roopadevi
Enagi Nataraj
Achyuth Kumar
 Rajesh
 Kitty
Kumar
Hemanth G Nag
 S Ashwath
 Dwarki

Production 
The film's director, Dwarki, previously worked with Kitty in the Tamil film Iruvar Mattum. The story is based on Narayana Mandagadde, an Indian prisoner who was held captive in Pakistan for twenty-one years.

Soundtrack
The music of the movie is composed by X.Paulraj.

"Chita Pata Pata" - Karthik, Shreya Ghoshal (lyrics : Dwarki Raghava)
"Helade Kaarana" - Asha Bhosle (lyrics : Dwarki Raghava)
"Summaniruva Ee Manasinali" - Ranjith (lyrics : Dwarki Raghava)
"Belagayitu" - Hariharan (lyrics : V. Nagendra Prasad)
"Kangalu Kanalive" - Karthikeyan (lyrics : Dwarki Raghava)
"Hey Janmabhoomi" - Vijay Prakash, K. S. Chithra (lyrics : Dwarki Raghava)

References

2010 films
2010s Kannada-language films